Cramaucheniinae is a paraphyletic subfamily of macraucheniids that originated in the middle Eocene (Mustersan SALMA). The size range of the group ranged from small, basal forms to larger and more derived forms. During their evolution, the cramaucheniines undergone a trend from evolving from small basal forms such as Polymorphis into larger, more derived taxa such as Theosodon.

References

Macraucheniids
Paleogene mammals of South America
Neogene mammals of South America
Mammal subfamilies
Lutetian first appearances
Serravallian extinctions
Paraphyletic groups